Rear-Admiral Victor Gabriel Brodeur, CB, CBE, CD (September 17, 1892 – October 6, 1976) was a Royal Canadian Navy officer. He was a member of the first batch of cadets accepted into the RCN and the first French speaker to reach the rank of rear admiral.

Brodeur was the son of the politician and judge Louis-Philippe Brodeur, who as Minister of the Naval Service introduced the Naval Service Act which created the Naval Service of Canada. In 1909, he was appointed officer cadet and assigned to CGS Canada, as part of the Navy's first group of six cadets. Of the six, only Percy Nelles rose higher in rank.

Appointed midshipman in 1910, he served in HMCS Niobe before being transferred to HMS Dreadnought in 1911. Appointed sub-lieutenant in 1913, he served in HMS Berwick in 1914 during the Mexican Revolution.

His son Nigel Brodeur reached the rank of vice admiral in the Royal Canadian Navy.

References 

1892 births
1976 deaths
Royal Canadian Navy personnel of World War II
Canadian admirals
Canadian Companions of the Order of the Bath
Canadian Commanders of the Order of the British Empire
Commanders of the Legion of Merit
Recipients of the Croix de Guerre 1939–1945 (France)
Commandeurs of the Légion d'honneur